Acrossocheilus ikedai is a species of ray-finned fish in the genus Acrossocheilus. It is endemic to China, where it inhabits the Yangtze river system in Hainan.

References

Ikedai
Cyprinid fish of Asia
Freshwater fish of China
Endemic fauna of China
Fish described in 1943